Miles Davis and Milt Jackson Quintet/Sextet, also known as Quintet/Sextet is a studio album by trumpeter Miles Davis and vibraphonist Milt Jackson released by Prestige Records in August of 1956. It was recorded on August 5, 1955. Credited to "Miles Davis and Milt Jackson", this was an "all-star" session, and did not feature any of the members of Davis's working group of that time. Alto saxophonist Jackie McLean appears on his own compositions “Dr. Jackle” and “Minor Apprehension”.

Background and recording

After the release of Blue Moods, a collaboration with Charles Mingus on which Davis only participated to pay back fees to Mingus, Davis recorded with his new band in New York's Café Bohemia. That band included the young Sonny Rollins (tenor saxophone) as well as the rhythm section of pianist Red Garland, bassist Paul Chambers and drummer Philly Joe Jones, whom Davis retained for the Miles Davis Quintet (with tenor saxophonist John Coltrane). This album’s August sessions did not feature Davis’ current working band, but an "All Star" lineup, with Milt Jackson (vibraphone), bassist Percy Heath and drummer Art Taylor. Davis also hired pianist Ray Bryant, because he wanted a bebop sound.

Together with Jackson and Heath, Davis recorded with Thelonious Monk during the December 1954 session (Miles Davis and the Modern Jazz Giants). Art Taylor was then effectively a "house drummer" for the Prestige label. 
Sonny Rollins was replaced with the young alto saxophonist Jackie McLean, who composed and arranged the two pieces on which he played, "Dr. Jackle" and "Minor March", the latter the only up-tempo tune in that session. "Minor March" (renamed "Minor Apprehension") was later included on McLean’s 1959 Blue Note album New Soil.

The tune "Dr. Jackle" shows McLean's connection with the blues as well as with Charlie Parker, Davis plays in a lyrical fashion and Ray Bryant plays in more rhythmic, soul-driven style. "Minor March" has rhythmic breaks and a bridge, that are similar to Bud Powell's composition "Tempus Fugue-it"; McLean's cadentials, honks and screams anticipate the style of his future Blue Note recordings.

Miles Davis commented critically in his autobiography on the saxophonist's style:

It was the last joint session by Miles Davis and Percy Heath as well as the only performance by pianist Ray Bryant on a Davis album. Bryant wrote "Blues Changes" (later renamed to "Changes"). Davis plays trumpet with a mute on this track, which has a typical romantic-tranquil mood. Thad Jones' composition "Bitty Ditty" is characterized by Bryant's integration of blues, gospel and bebop.

Reception

Quintet/Sextet received overall positive reception. Davis' biographer Peter Wießmüller said that this album is "way more straightforward and intensive than Blue Moods, released four weeks prior", and "the pendulum in Miles' stylistical progression hits in the direction of the experimential workup of bebop into a closed hardbop concept, and conservative as well as progressive elements are getting fused with each other; (...) the subtle arrangements of Blue Moods are yielded towards a certain expressive hardness".

Jackie McLean is encouraged by the other musicians to play markedly long and fantastic solos in the otherwise typical arrangements of "Dr. Jackle" and "Minor March". The short session is revived through "the excellent vibraphone playing by Milt Jackson and Jackie McLean's extroverted alto phrasing, which emphasizes Bird's heritage more than before, greatly revive the musical scene."

Critics Richard Cook and Brian Morton awarded the album 4 out of 5 stars in Penguin Guide to Jazz. Scott Yanow from Allmusic only gave the album 3 out of 5 stars, and stated it was "one of the most obscure of [Davis's] Prestige recordings", but its quality is still "fairly high". He named "Dr. Jackle" and "Minor March" as his highlights.

Track listing

Personnel
Miles Davis – trumpet
Milt Jackson – vibraphone
Jackie McLean – alto saxophone (“Dr. Jackle” & “Minor March”)
Ray Bryant – piano
Percy Heath – bass
Art Taylor – drums

References

Sources
 Richard Cook & Brian Morton. The Penguin Guide to Jazz on CD 6th edition. 
 Miles Davis, Quincy Troupe: Miles, the Autobiography: Simon and Schuster, 1990. 
 Dan Morgenstern: Liner Notes. CD issue of Chronicle – The Complete Prestige Recordings
 (In German) Eric Nisenson: Round about Midnight – Ein Portrait von Miles Davis. Wien, Hannibal, 1985 
 (In German) Peter Wießmüller: Miles Davis. Oreos, Schaftlach, 1985

External links
 Review by Scott Yanow on Allmusic
Original liner notes

1956 albums
Miles Davis albums
Prestige Records albums
Albums recorded at Van Gelder Studio
Albums produced by Bob Weinstock